Konstantin Velichkov Metro Station is a station on the Sofia Metro in Bulgaria. It is named after writer and politician Konstantin Velichkov and opened on 28 January 1998.

Interchange with other public transport
 Tramway service: 3, 8, 10, 11, 19, 22
 City Bus service: 11, 83

Location

External links
 360 degrees panorama from inside the station
 Sofia Metropolitan (Official site)
 Unofficial site
 360 degrees panorama from outside the station (west end)

Sofia Metro stations
Railway stations opened in 1998
1998 establishments in Bulgaria